William Reginald Ward  (1925 – 2010) was a British historian who was President of the Ecclesiastical History Society and Secretary, President and Vice-President of the Chetham Society.

He was born in Chesterfield, Derbyshire to Primitive Methodist parents. He studied at Oxford, where he met his future wife, Barbara. He taught at Ruskin College whilst working on his PhD.

Initially, Ward concentrated his studies on eighteenth century British history but the bulk of his work concerned religious history. He was one of the co-editors on the definitive, scholarly edition of John Wesley's works.

He was a Member of the Chetham Society, serving as a Member of Council (1964-2010), Secretary (1964–84), President (1984–92), and Vice-President (1993-2010). He was a Fellow of the Royal Historical Society and British Academy and also President of the Ecclesiastical History Society (1970–71).

Works
Georgian Oxford: University Politics in the Eighteenth Century (Clarendon Press, 1958).
Victorian Oxford (Routledge, 1965).
Religion & Society in England: 1790-1850 (HarperCollins, 1972).
The Protestant Evangelical Awakening (Cambridge University Press, 1992).
Christianity under the Ancien Régime, 1648-1789 (Cambridge University Press, 1999).
Early Evangelicalism: A Global Intellectual History, 1670-1789 (Cambridge University Press, 2006).

Notes

1925 births
2010 deaths
Alumni of the University of Oxford
English historians
People from Chesterfield, Derbyshire
Presidents of the Ecclesiastical History Society
Chetham Society